Stephan Otto (1603–1656) was a German composer and kantor in Freiberg and Schandau. He worked for Count Rudolf von Bünau in Weesenstein, and was mentor and probably teacher to Andreas Hammerschmidt.

Works, editions, recordings
Dialogue "Mein Sohn warumb hast du uns das gethan"
Der Mensch vom Weibe geboren. On collection Von den letzten Dingen. Amarcord.

References

1603 births
1656 deaths
German Baroque composers
17th-century classical composers
German male classical composers
German classical composers
17th-century male musicians